The Janáček Quartet is a Czech string quartet musical ensemble founded in 1947 which is still currently active.

Origins and activities 
The Janáček Quartet was formed in 1947 by students of Váša Černý at the Conservatory of Brno, originally under the name JAMU Quartet. The quartet initially concentrated mainly on Janáček's chamber works. In 1949, the ensemble changed its name to Janáček Quartet, after the Moravian composer Leoš Janáček. Trávníček had some musical ties with him (he was a student of František Kudláček, a member of Moravian Quartet that premiered Janáček’s String Quartet No. 2., "Intimate Letters" and edited the work in cooperation with the composer).

The substitution of Adolf Sýkora for Miroslav Matyáš in 1952 was the only personnel change during the first twenty-five years, until the death of Jiří Trávníček in 1973. Winning a competition in the former West Berlin in 1955 opened the door to great concert halls and since then they have gained international recognition. Recordings by the quartet have won numerous awards, including the Grand Prix of the Charles Cros Academy, and the Preis der deutschen Schallplattenkritik (both for recording of Janáček’s string quartets). The Janáček Quartet has made recordings for Deutsche Grammophon, Supraphon, Eterna, Decca and other labels.

The quartet is unusual among string quartets in performing without sheet music, from memory.  It is also noted for a distinctive style of playing.

Personnel 
1st violin
Jiří Trávníček (1947–1973)
Bohumil Smejkal (1973–  ?  )
Miloš Vacek (current)

2nd violin
Miroslav Matyáš (1947–1952)
Adolf Sýkora (1952–(after 1973))
Vítězslav Zavadilík (current)

viola
Jiří Kratochvíl (1947–(after 1973))
Ladislav Kyselák (1989–2008)
Jan Řezníček (current)

cello
Karel Krafka (1947–(after 1973))
Břetislav Vybíral (current)

References 
Adolf Sýkora: Z mého života v Janáčkově kvartetu. Brno: Opus musicum, 2007. 
Janáček/Novák: String Quartets CD. Supraphon Archive SU 3460-2111

External links 
 http://www.janacekquartet.com//

Czech string quartets
Musical groups established in 1947
1947 establishments in Czechoslovakia